Vympel Design Bureau is a Russian ship design company based in Nizhny Novgorod.

History 

The company was established in 1927 as a branch of the Leningrad Maritime Shipbuilding Bureau. The company was granted the status of a self-sufficient organization under the name State Office of River and Sea Ships Design in 1930 and was renamed Central Design Bureau No. 51 in 1939. In 1966–1972, the company was known as Central Design Office "Volgobaltsudoproyekt" before receiving its current name.

Recent projects 
 Project 21900M icebreakers
 Vladivostok
 Murmansk
 Novorossiysk
 Viktor Chernomyrdin (design modification)
 Ilya Muromets

References

External links 

Boat and ship designers
Companies based in Nizhny Novgorod
1927 establishments in Russia
Design companies established in 1927
Transport companies of Russia
Design bureaus